= Elgaada Dam =

Dam in Morocco

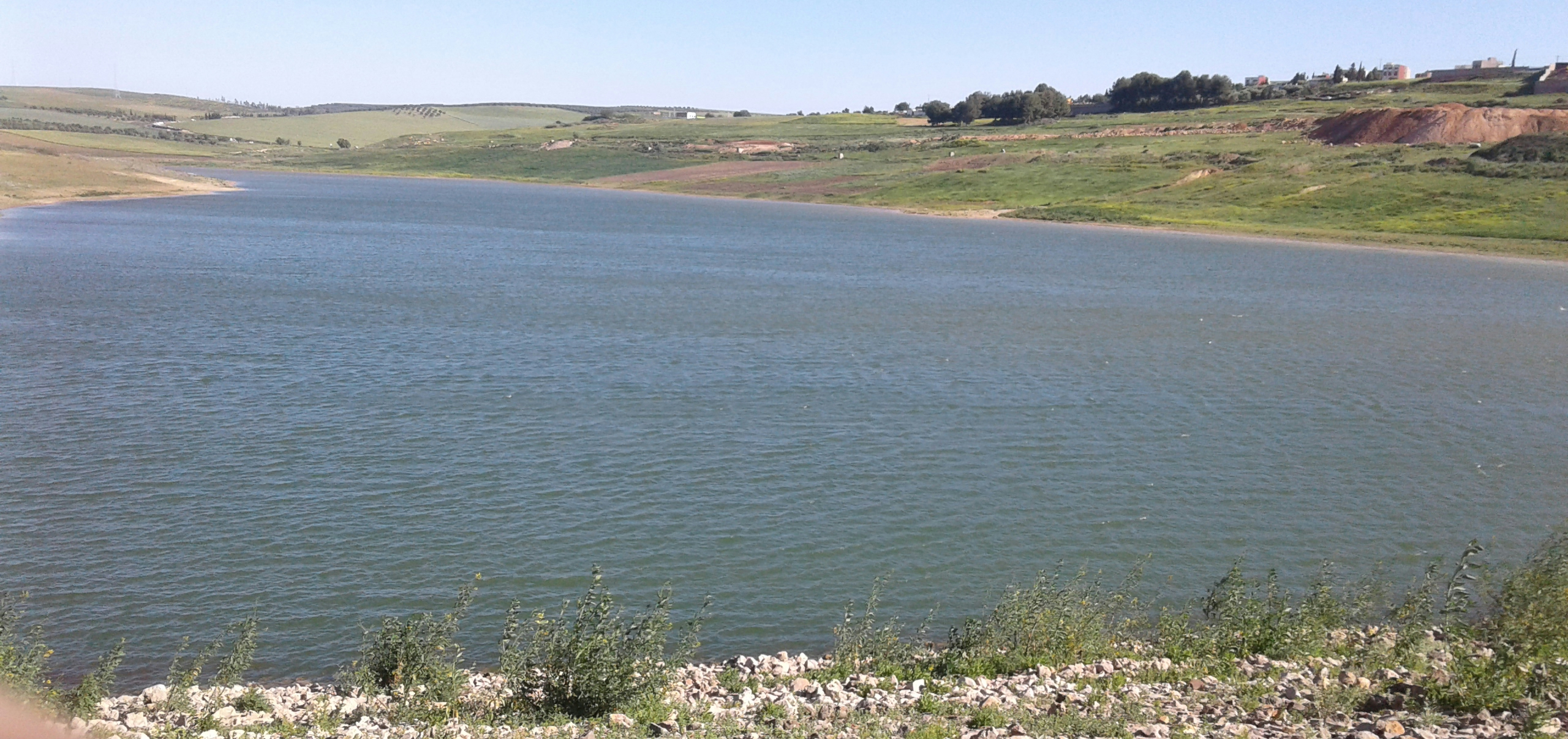
- Interactive map of Elgaada Dam
- Country: Morocco
- Location: Fes

Elgaada Dam is one of the water dams on north of Morocco. The elgaada dam is located on the eastern border of the city of fez with an axe machine, with a water vessel of 350.000 cubic metres.
